Nigel de Wavere DD (also Waver, Wavery, or Waure) was an English medieval theologian, churchman, college fellow, and university chancellor.

Nigel de Wavere was from Cahors in Guienne.  He was a Fellow at Merton College, Oxford in 1312 and received a Doctor of Divinity degree. He became a Canon of St David's Cathedral in Wales and a Rector of Croydon. Between 1330 and 1332, he was Chancellor of Oxford University. He was also a Prebend of Lichfield.

References

Year of birth unknown
Year of death unknown
People from Cahors
English theologians
14th-century English Roman Catholic priests
Fellows of Merton College, Oxford
Chancellors of the University of Oxford